Christian Cenci (born 24 January 1998) is an Italian football player who plays for Serie D club F.C. Vado.

Club career
He made his Serie C debut for Ravenna on 27 August 2017 in a game against Fermana.

References

External links
 
 
 Christian Cenci at TuttoCampo

1998 births
Sportspeople from Rimini
Living people
Italian footballers
Association football midfielders
A.S.D. Victor San Marino players
Ravenna F.C. players
Forlì F.C. players
F.C. Vado players
Serie C players
Serie D players
Italian expatriate footballers
Expatriate footballers in San Marino
Footballers from Emilia-Romagna